Scott Arnold may refer to:

 Scott Arnold (baseball) (born 1962), American baseball player
 Scott Arnold (fencer) (born 1965), Australian fencer
 Scott Arnold (golfer) (born 1985), Australian golfer
 Scott Arnold (ice hockey) (born 1989), Canadian ice hockey player
 Scott Arnold (squash player) (born 1986), Australian squash player

See also